Francis Mowatt (1803 – 12 February 1891) was a British Radical politician.

Mowatt married Sarah Sophia, daughter of Captain Barnes of Romford, and they had at least one son, Francis Mowatt, a British civil servant.

Mowatt was first elected Radical MP for Penryn and Falmouth at the 1847 general election, and held the seat until 1852 when he unsuccessfully sought election at Cambridge. He was later elected MP for the latter seat at a by-election in 1854—caused by the 1852 result being declared void due to bribery and treating. He held the seat until 1857, when he did not seek re-election, and was unsuccessful when he again stood in 1859.

References

External links
 

UK MPs 1852–1857
1803 births
1891 deaths
Members of the Parliament of the United Kingdom for Penryn and Falmouth
Members of the Parliament of the United Kingdom for English constituencies